The Brown's Chicken Massacre was a mass murder that occurred on January 8, 1993 in Palatine, Illinois, when two robbers killed seven employees at a Brown's Chicken fast-food restaurant.

The case remained unsolved for nearly nine years, until one of the assailants was implicated by his girlfriend in 2002. Police used DNA samples from the murder scene to match one of the suspects, Juan Luna. Luna was put on trial in 2007, found guilty of seven counts of first degree murder, and sentenced to life imprisonment. James Degorski, the other assailant, was found guilty in 2009 on all seven counts of first degree murder, and sentenced to life imprisonment without parole.

Incident
On January 8, 1993, seven people were shot and killed at the Brown's Chicken & Pasta at 168 West Northwest Highway in Palatine. The victims included the owners, Richard and Lynn Ehlenfeldt, and five employees: Guadalupe Maldonado, Michael C. Castro and Rico L. Solis (Castro and Solis were Palatine High School students working there part-time), Thomas Mennes, and Marcus Nellsen. The assailants stole between $1,800 and $1,900 from the restaurant, . 

Two of the Ehlenfeldts' daughters were scheduled to be at the restaurant that night, but weren't present at the time of the killing. A third daughter, Jennifer, was later elected to the Wisconsin State Senate.

Michael Castro's parents called the police a couple hours after closing time. Later, Guadalupe Maldonado's wife also called the police, concerned that her husband did not return home from work and that his car was still in the apparently closed Brown's Chicken parking lot. When officers arrived at the building, they spotted the rear employees' door open. Inside, they found the seven bodies, some face-down, some face-up, in a cooler and in a walk-in refrigerator. When Palatine police found the bodies, it was more than 5½ hours after the 9 p.m. closing.

Perpetrators

In March 2002, more than nine years after the murders, Anne Lockett came forward and implicated her former boyfriend, James Degorski, and his associate, Juan Luna, in the crime. Luna, then aged 18, was a former employee of the restaurant. In April 2002, the Palatine Police Department matched a DNA sample from Luna to a sample of saliva from a piece of partially eaten chicken found in the garbage during the crime scene investigation. 

The chicken was kept in a freezer for most of the time since the crime. Testimony at trial indicated it was not frozen for several days after discovery, and was allowed to thaw several times for examination and testing, in the hope of an eventual match via increasingly sophisticated testing methods not available in 1993.

The Palatine Police Department took the two suspects into custody on May 16, 2002. Luna confessed to the crime during an interrogation, though his lawyers later claimed that he was coerced to do so through police brutality and threats of deportation. The pair, who met at Palatine's William Fremd High School, subsequently went to trial.

On May 10, 2007, Juan Luna was found guilty of all seven counts of murder. He was sentenced to life in prison without parole on May 17. The state sought the death penalty, which was available at the time, but the jury's vote of eleven-to-one in favor of the death penalty fell short of the required unanimity to impose it.

On September 29, 2009, James Degorski was found guilty of all seven counts of murder, largely on the testimony of his former girlfriend Anne Lockett and another woman, who both stated that Degorski confessed to them. On October 20, 2009, he was sentenced to life in prison without parole. All but two of the jurors voted for the death penalty.

In March 2014, a jury awarded James Degorski $451,000 in compensation and punitive damages after being beaten by a Sheriff's deputy in Cook County Jail in May 2002. He suffered facial fractures that required surgery. The deputy was eventually dismissed.

Aftermath 

The incident had an adverse effect on the entire Brown's Chicken franchise. Sales at all restaurants dropped 35 percent within months of the incident, and the company eventually had to close 100 restaurants in the Chicago area.

The building was razed in April 2001, after briefly housing a dry cleaning establishment and then standing vacant for many years. A Chase Bank branch office was constructed at the former Brown's location.

Luna and Degorski are imprisoned at the Stateville Correctional Center.

See also 

 Lane Bryant shooting, a similar murder of shoppers and workers on February 2, 2008, in Tinley Park, Illinois
 List of massacres in Illinois

Notes and references

Further reading
 Possley, Maurice. The Brown's Chicken Massacre, Berkeley, 2003. Paperback, 
 Shere, Dennis. "The Last Meal: Defending an Accused Mass Murderer," Titletown, 2010. Paperback, 

1993 deaths
1993 in Illinois
1993 mass shootings in the United States
1993 murders in the United States
Attacks on restaurants in North America
Crime in Illinois
Criminal duos
Deaths by firearm in Illinois
January 1993 events in the United States
Massacres in the United States
Mass murder in 1993
Mass shootings in Illinois
Massacres in 1993
Murder in Illinois
Palatine, Illinois